Mummy Mountain is a mountain situated in Paradise Valley, Arizona, United States.Composed of Early Proterozoic metasedimentary rocks

Age: Statherian (1800 - 1600 Ma) 

Metasedimentary rocks, mostly derived from sandstone and shale, with minor conglomerate and carbonate rock. Includes quartz-rich, mostly nonvolcanic Pinal Schist.

The slopes of the mountain incorporate primarily suburban residential development while the upper summit areas are conservation sites.  Camelback Inn has been located on the southern slope since 1936. As the only part of the Phoenix Mountains not held within the Phoenix Mountain Preserve, portions of Mummy Mountain are protected by the Mummy Mountain Preserve Trust and the town of Paradise Valley.

Name
The formation originally was known as Windy Gulch and Horseshoe Mountain but was later renamed by miner and businessman Charles Mieg, who purchased most of the property in the 1940s for $12,000. He observed that the mountain's profile resembled an Egyptian mummy lying down. When he began selling parcels for development, Mieg marketed the land using the name Mummy Mountain.

Conservation
The Mummy Mountain Preserve Trust is a 501 (c)(3) charitable trust established in 1997 to preserve the natural landscape of approximately  along the mountain ridge. Local celebrities including Marshall Trimble, Joe Garagiola, Clive Cussler and Bil Keane supported a campaign asking property owners for donations of land. Through private donations and transfer of public land from Maricopa County,  were controlled by the trust by August 1999.

References

Mountains of Arizona
Geography of Phoenix, Arizona
Landforms of Maricopa County, Arizona
Protected areas of Maricopa County, Arizona
Nature reserves in Arizona
Mountains of Maricopa County, Arizona